The Marin Society of Artists (MSA) is an arts nonprofit 501(c)(3) organization founded in 1927, and located at 1515 3rd Street in San Rafael, California. It is the first and the oldest art organization in Marin County. Formerly known as the Marin Art Association, and formerly part of the Marin Arts and Garden Center.

History 
Starting around 1927, a group of around 50 artists, primarily from San Francisco, who would travel on the weekends to Marin County. They came together to form the "Marin Art Association", one of which was William Rauschnabel. In 1935, the name was changed to the Marin Society of Artists.

In 1944, the Marin Society of Artists joined together with 7 other local organizations to purchased 11 acres of land from the former Kittle Estate at 30 Sir Francis Drake Blvd. in Ross, California. The groups incorporated the following year for loan purposes, under the name Marin Arts and Garden Center (MAGC). Eventually only three organizations remained on the land including the MSA, the Ross Valley Players, and the Marin Garden Society. 

In 2015, membership was around 200 people. With the rising cost of rents in 2015, MSA decided to leave the Marin Arts and Garden Center in Ross and move to its present location in San Rafael.

References

External links 
 Official website

Arts organizations established in 1927
501(c)(3) organizations
Art in the San Francisco Bay Area
Non-profit organizations based in California
Arts organizations based in the San Francisco Bay Area
1927 establishments in California
Art museums and galleries in San Francisco